Mir Ahmed Ali Khan Siddiqi Bayafandi, Nasir Jung, was the son of Nizam-ul-Mulk by his wife Saeed-un-nisa Begum. He was born 26 February 1712. He succeeded his father as the Nizam of Hyderabad State in 1748. He had taken up a title of Humayun Jah, Nizam ud-Daula, Nawab Mir Ahmad Ali Khan Siddiqi Bahadur, Nasir Jung, Nawab Subadar of the Deccan. However, he is most famously known as Nasir Jung.

The Mughal Emperor Muhammad Shah bestowed him with the title Nasir Jung and later the next Mughal Emperor Ahmad Shah Bahadur appointed him as the Subedar of the Deccan and bestowed him with the title Nasir-ud-Daula.

Official name
His official name was Humayun, Nizam ud-Daula, Nawab Mir Ahmad Ali Khan Siddiqi Bayafandi Bahadur, Nasir Jang, Nawab Subadar of the Deccan.

Rise to power
In his early career, he defied the Marathas by refusing to pay tribute and Chauth to Chhatrapati (Emperor) Shahu. The Peshwa Bajirao marched against Nasir Jung who was stationed at Jalna governing the state of Hyderabad in the absence of Nijam. Bajirao with 30,000 cavalry attacked Nasir Jung and his army near Jalna and defeated him in open field battle. Nasir Jung surrendered to Bajirao and paid a tribute of one crore (10,000,000) of Rupees and restitution of 75 lakhs 7,500,000) of Rupees. He also handed over the territories of Srirangapatanam, Vellore and Gingee to the Marathas under the governorship of Murari Rao.

He ruled Hyderabad State in India from 1 June 1748 to 1750. He was appointed as his father's Deputy during his absence in Delhi from 1737 to 1741. In 1741 he attempted to seize power, but was defeated by his father at the Eid Gah Maidan in Aurangabad, on 23 July 1741. After his father's death, he ascended the throne on 2 June 1748 at Burhanpur.

Second Carnatic War

After the death of the Nizam-ul-Mulk, the Nizam of Hyderabad, a civil war for succession broke out in south between Nasir Jung (son of the Nizam-ul-Mulk) and Muzaffar Jung (grandson of the Nizam-ul-Mulk from his daughter). This opened a window of opportunity for Hussain Dost Khan better known as Chanda Sahib who wanted to become Nawab of Carnatic and joined the cause of Muzaffar Jung and began to conspire against Nawab Anwar-ud-din Muhammad Khan in Arcot.

The Europeans got directly involved in the affairs of the Deccan and Carnatic. This resulted in the Second Carnatic War which was an unofficial war fought between the British East India Company and the French Compagnie de Indes at a time when there was peace between the two powers in Europe. Its roots lay in Dupleix's (French Governor) skillful exploitation of the confused politics of the region to enhance French power through a series of Indian alliances.

The French sided with Chanda Sahib and Muzaffar Jung to bring them into power in their respective states. But soon the British intervened. To offset the French influence, they began supporting Nasir Jung and Muhammad Ali Khan Walajah the son of late Nawab Anwar-ud-din Muhammad Khan who had recently been killed by the French in Battle of Ambur in 1749. 
	
There were initial successes for the French in both Deccan and Carnatc in defeating and murdering their opponents and placing their supporters on thrones by 1750. It was during one such success that Nasir Jung was killed at Dupleix-Fathabad (Sarasangupettai), near Gingee, by the Pathan Himmat Khan who was Nawab of Kadapa, on 16 December 1750. He was buried at the Mausoleum of Burhan ud-Din Gharib, Khuldabad. As a result, Muzaffar Jung succeeded to the throne of Hyderabad.

Later, the famous capture of Arcot by the English under Robert Clive in 1751 led to successive British victories and of their South Indian Allies. The war ended with the Treaty of Pondicherry, signed in 1754–55. Muhammad Ali Khan Walajah was recognized as the Nawab of Carnatic. Joseph François Dupleix the French leader was asked to return to France. The directors of the French Compagnie de Indes were dissatisfied with the political ambitions of Dupleix, which had led to immense financial loss. In 1754, Godeheu replaced Dupleix.

Death
He was killed at Sarasangupettai, near Gingee, by Himmat Khan, the Nawab of Kurnool, on 16 December 1750. He is buried next to his father at Khuldabad, within the shrine of Burhan ud-Din Gharib.

Positions held
Subedar of Aurangabad 1745–1746.
Nizam

References

External links
Hyderabad's history

Mughal nobility
1712 births
1750 deaths
18th-century Indian Muslims
Nizams of Hyderabad
People from Burhanpur
18th-century Indian royalty